Uruguay competed at the 2012 Summer Paralympics in London, United Kingdom, from 29 August to 9 September 2012.

Swimming

Men

See also

 Uruguay at the 2012 Summer Olympics

References

Nations at the 2012 Summer Paralympics
2012
2012 in Uruguayan sport